Matthew Hutter (born May 19, 1971) is a retired American stock car racing driver. He has raced in the NASCAR Busch Series and NASCAR Craftsman Truck Series.

Hutter won the pole for the 1996 NASCAR Slim Jim All Pro Series Slim Jim 200 at Nashville Speedway USA, his first ever race at the famed short track. He made his NASCAR national touring series debut in 1998, driving the No. 36 Stanley Tools Pontiac Grand Prix for Team 34 in 15 races. His best finish was a ninth at Talladega Superspeedway, but he was released following the Lycos.com 250. He made one start later that year at IRP, filling for Jeff Purvis in the No. 4 car; he finished 36th. He also ran two Truck races that year, driving the Axicom Ford at Fontana, and the No. 11 for Phil Bonifield at Gateway, finishing 22nd and 23rd, respectively.

In 1999, he ran five races in the No. 99 Red Man Chevrolet for Bill Papke, his best finish being an eleventh at Fontana. He drove two races in 2000 for Phoenix Racing, his best finish a 19th at Daytona. He ran a few races in the ARCA RE/MAX Series, but has since dropped off the racing scene.

Motorsports career results

NASCAR
(key) (Bold - Pole position awarded by qualifying time. Italics - Pole position earned by points standings or practice time. * – Most laps led.)

Busch Series

Craftsman Truck Series

ARCA Bondo/Mar-Hyde Series

References

External links
 

Living people
1971 births
People from Chardon, Ohio
Racing drivers from Ohio
NASCAR drivers
ARCA Menards Series drivers
American Speed Association drivers